Ashestoangels were an English horror punk six piece band hailing from Bristol, England. The band is widely recognised as "ringleaders of the U.K. 'new grave' movement," a term coined by Kerrang! Magazine to describe dark alternative rock bands, including New Years Day, DEAD! and Creeper.

The band has received critical acclaim such as a nomination for Best British Newcomer at the 2015 Relentless Kerrang! Awards, voted as a 2015 Best British Newcomer by Rock Sound, and named “One of 12 Bands You Need to Know” for January 2016 by Alternative Press.

Significant tours and festival appearances

2019 
 From The Grave To The Stage Tour - co-headline tour with Griever - 10–27 October

2018 
 Ashestoangels w/Fail The Enemy & Kill The Silence tour - 18–25 August

2016
Fort Hope – 22–29 October
Hawthorne Heights - 9–19 August 
Download Festival – 12 June
Camden Rocks Festival – 4 June
Aiden (The Last Sunrise Tour UK) - 16–29 January

2015
Aiden (The Last Sunrise Tour US Leg) – 26 October – 5 November
First US Tour dates with Black Veil Brides – 22–23 October – California 
British Horror Story tour – 17–28 July
Whitby Goth Weekend – 23–26 April
Takedown Festival – 7 March

2014 
The Punishment Tour with William Control - 21–28 April

Band members 
 Adam Crilly (aka Crilly Ashes) - Lead vocals, synthesizers, piano
 Adam Folklore - Lead & rhythm guitars, backing vocals
 Josh Jones - Lead, rhythm guitars and harmony guitars, backing vocals - Front man of solo side project “Misery Merchant” (formerly “Coast To Ghost”)
 Chris Kiddier - Bass, gang vocals, synthesizers and creator of the Ashestoangels Filterpress remixes available on Spotify
 Nikki Kontinen - Synthesizers, keyboards, programmed drums, piano, backing vocals - Bass player for the band “Bad Pollyanna”
 Jarlath McCaughery - Drums, gang vocals - formerly of “As Sirens Fall”

Discography

Studio albums

Extended plays

Influences and work with William Control
The band cite; Kill Hannah, William Control, and Aiden as shared influences among all members. They recorded albums Horror Cult (2014) and How To Bleed (2016) with Control, the former at Southampton studio The Ranch, for which they flew the producer to the UK with money raised via a fan-supported Indiegogo campaign; and the latter at Control's own Hell's Half Acre studios in Seattle. They would also go on to support Aiden's farewell tours in the US (2015) and UK (2016).

The name "Ashestoangels" is derived from Ashes to Ashes. Vocalist Adam Crilly says that David Bowie was among his earliest musical influences.

References

External links 
 
 

Musical groups established in 2009
English rock music groups
Horror punk groups